Mashed Potatoes is Steve Alaimo's second album for Checker Records. Like his previous album, it capitalizes on a dance craze, only this time, the Mashed Potato.

Track listing

Side 1
 "Mashed Potatoes, Part 1"
 "Ooh Poo-Pah-Doo" (Jessie Hill)
 "She's My Baby"
 "I Like It Like That"
 "Peanut Butter"
 "You're So Fine"

Side 2
 "Mashed Potatoes, Part 2"
 "Ya-Ya"
 "Hully Gully With Me"
 "Heart Break"
 "Baby What You Want Me to Do"
 "I Got a Woman"

1962 albums
Steve Alaimo albums
Checker Records albums